The La Voce was an Italian daily newspaper published in Milan from March 1994 to April 1995. It was founded by journalist Indro Montanelli after a disagreement with Silvio Berlusconi, at that time owner of the Il Giornale newspaper of which Montanelli had been the founder and editor in chief.
Montanelli would later rejoin Corriere della Sera as a columnist.

References

1994 establishments in Italy
1995 disestablishments in Italy
Defunct newspapers published in Italy
Defunct daily newspapers
Daily newspapers published in Italy
Newspapers published in Milan
Publications established in 1994
Publications disestablished in 1995